Italian Libya Railways was a group of small railways built in the Italian colony of Libya between the two World Wars.

History
The Kingdom of Italy built in Italian Libya nearly 400 km of railways with  gauge.

Projects
The Italian authorities decided to give priority to the construction of roads in Libya when Benito Mussolini took control of the Italian colonies. After 1926 no more railways were made in Libya, but during World War II the need of railways transport to the front during the war in the frontier with British Egypt changed this approach.

In spring 1941 the Italian government started the construction of a new railway between Tripoli  and Benghazi, but by the end of 1942 all was stopped because of the Italian defeat in north Africa: only 18 km were done in Cirenaica. In the same period was started the enlargement of the "Tripoli-Zuara" until the border with Tunisia (and also these works was blocked by the Italian defeat at El Alamein in November 1942).

Additionally it is noteworthy to pinpoint that an international project was studied for decades, but never done because of excessive financial difficulties:
 Italian "Transaharan railway" (Tripoli-Tchad/Camerun) between Libia and the Gulf of Guinea

Equipment
In Libya the first locomotives were the steam locomotives R.401 and R.301, but the most successful were the R.302 produced in northern Italy.

Railways
There were only five small railways:

1) Tripoli-Zuara (118 km):

2) Bengazi-Barce (108 km):

3) Tripoli-Garian (90 km):

4) Bengasi-Soluch (56 km):

5) Tripoli-Tagiura (21 km):

Gallery

See also
 Railway stations in Libya
 History of Libya as Italian colony
 Italian colonial railways
 Italian Libya
 Eritrean Railway

References

Italian Libya
Rail transport in Libya
History of Cyrenaica
History of Tripolitania
Italy–Libya relations
950 mm gauge railways in Libya